Al Hawadeth (Arabic: الحوادث; The Events) was a weekly news magazine which was published in Beirut, Lebanon, in the period 1911–2014 with some interruptions. The magazine is known for its publishers and editors: Salim Lawzi who was assassinated in March 1980, and Melhem Karam, who was a veteran journalist.

History and profile
Al Hawadeth was launched in Beirut in 1911. The founder was Latfallah Khyat who was also the publisher of the magazine. Salim Lawzi acquired it in 1955 and was its editor-in-chief until his assassination in 1980. It was published on a weekly basis. Al Hawadeth was temporarily stopped publication shortly after the start of unrest in Lebanon in 1958 when Lawzi left Lebanon for Syria. Following his return to Lebanon the magazine was restarted. On 30 September 1961 the offices of the magazine were attacked with the sticks of dynamite which caused slight damages. 

It was again temporarily suspended in 1977 when its offices was attacked and Lawzi settled in the United Kingdom. Al Hawadeth continued its publication in London for a while. There an English edition of the magazine was started with the title of Events. The magazine had a pro-Saudi political stance during the ownership of Salim Lawzi.

Later Al Hawadeth was relocated in Beirut and owned and edited by the leading Lebanese journalist Melhem Karam until 2010. He died from a heart attack on 23 May 2010. Under his ownership its publisher was Dar Alf Leila Wa Leila which also published Al Bayrak, La Revue du Liban and Monday Morning. Al Hawadeth ceased publication in 2014.

Contributors
Syrian novelist Ghada Samman joined the magazine as a correspondent in 1969. One of the contributors of Al Hawadeth during its London period was Nahida Nakad who started her journalistic career in the magazine. Palestinian writer Samira Azzam was another regular contributor of the magazine.

References

1911 establishments in Ottoman Syria
21st century in Beirut
20th century in Beirut
2014 disestablishments in Lebanon
Arabic-language magazines
Defunct magazines published in Lebanon
Magazines established in 1911
Magazines disestablished in 2014
Magazines published in Beirut
Magazines published in London
News magazines published in Asia
Weekly magazines published in Lebanon
Weekly news magazines